Percy & Thunder is a 1993 television film directed by Ivan Dixon. It premiered on TNT on September 7, 1993.

Plot
Percy (James Earl Jones) and Thunder (Courtney B. Vance) have been with themselves around the past so they are finding it. Percy and Thunder meets with Leatherhead (Mick E. Jones) a corrupt boss and VFW Refree (Ron Shipp) are having a fight against Percy and Thunder to commit it. Percy takes Thunder and Leatherhear and VFW Refree to let Percy know he has to track down an Assassin and then Percy finds the assassins outside and then fights and kills them and tells Leatherhead assignment is done. Percy and Thunder tells Leatherhead and VFW Refree to see them later. Percy goes to find Promoter (Mike Finneran) to know he is bored and then knows the answers and then can use it anytime. Percy and Promoter take a road trip down the road and then they view what's on the road. Percy and Promoter find the helicopter and then all the targets arrive and then Percy knocks out all the targets and then returns to Promoter. Percy tells Promoter that it's good to spend time with itself to know when it's time for it.

Cast
James Earl Jones as Percy
Courtney B. Vance as Thunder
Billy Dee Williams as Ralph Tate
Robert Wuhl

Reception
TV Guide said of the film, "Boasting a well-constructed screenplay, the sometimes declamatory PERCY AND THUNDER is gripping despite an occasional cliched interlude."

References

1993 films
1993 television films
1990s sports films
American boxing films
TNT Network original films
1990s American films